Mohamad Nasir Bin Basharudin (born 29 March 1990) is a Malaysian professional footballer who plays for Petaling Jaya City and the Malaysia national team. Nasir mainly plays as a central midfielder but can also play as a defensive midfielder.

Club career
Nasir began his professional career playing for UPB-MyTeam youth team, before moved to Perak youth team in 2009. He was in the Perak team that competed in the 2010 Sukma Games. He was released from his contract with Perak at the end of the 2011 season, but was re-signed by Perak in April 2012 to cope with the loss of players through injuries.

Nasir were to become the mainstay in the Perak team in 2013 and 2014 season, after the release of several senior players from Perak. In the absence of regular captain Mohammad Hardi Jaafar in 2014 due to injuries, Nasir has captained the team for several games. After the departure of Hardi, Nasir was appointed as the team captain from the 2015 season until his last season with Perak FA on 2019.

International career
Nasir has played for Malaysia U-23 team under Ong Kim Swee. He made his debut for the team in the 2013 Merdeka Tournament scored 1 goal in a 3–0 win over Thailand selection team. Nasir was also included in the Malaysia 2013 Southeast Asian Games football squad.

On 16 June 2015, Nasir made his debut as first eleven for the Malaysia senior team in a 0–6 defeat to Palestine.

Career statistics

Club

International

Style of play
Nasir daily plays as a defensive midfielder for Perak, but can also plays as a defender. He was also used as an attacking midfielder in the Malaysia U-23 squad. Nasir's long shots are his assets for his team, and he can also launch long throw-ins into the opponent's penalty box.

References

External links
 
 

1990 births
Living people
Malaysian people of Malay descent
People from Perak
Malaysian footballers
Malaysia international footballers
Perak F.C. players
Terengganu FC players
Association football midfielders